HICL Infrastructure Company (formerly HSBC Infrastructure Company Ltd) is a large British investment company dedicated to infrastructure investments. The company is focused on three segments: public–private partnership (PPP) and private finance initiative (PFI) (social and transport projects), regulated assets (gas and electricity transmission and distribution, and water utilities) and demand-based assets (such as toll road concessions and student accommodation). Portfolio Investments are located primarily in the United Kingdom, but also in Australia, North America and Europe and investments are generally operational.

Established in 2006, the company is managed by InfraRed Capital Partners and it is a constituent of the FTSE 250 Index. The chairman is Ian Russell.

References

External links

Financial services companies established in 2006
Infrastructure investment
Companies listed on the London Stock Exchange